

Natural lakes

Reservoir and dam lakes

See also

Geography of Turkey
Regions of Turkey
Rivers of Turkey
Dams and reservoirs of Turkey
Turkish Lakes Region, in southwest Anatolia

Turkey
Lakes